Edward D. Jones & Co., L.P., (since 1995, d.b.a. Edward Jones Investments), simplified as Edward Jones, is a financial services firm headquartered in St. Louis, Missouri, United States. It serves investment clients in the U.S. and Canada, through its branch network of more than 15,000 locations and 19,000 financial advisors. The company currently has relationships with nearly 8 million clients and $1.7 trillion in assets, under management worldwide. The firm focuses solely on individual investors and small-business owners. Edward Jones is a subsidiary of The Jones Financial Companies, L.L.L.P., a limited liability limited partnership owned only by its employees and retired employees and is not publicly traded. Edward Jones appointed Penny Pennington as managing partner, effective January 2019, making her the firm's sixth managing partner and the only woman to lead a major U.S. brokerage firm.

History

Edward Jones was founded by Edward D. Jones in St. Louis, Missouri in 1922. (A different Edward D. Jones was a co-founder of Dow Jones.) Edward Jones' son Edward D. "Ted" Jones was responsible for the creation of the individual branch network, which has spread across rural communities and suburbs throughout the US and Canada.  The first single broker office was opened by Ted, and staffed by Zeke McIntyre, in Mexico, Missouri. Ted opened another branch office in Pueblo, Colorado, with his brother-in-law Bill Lloyd as manager of the multi-broker office. When Edward D. Jones Sr., found the teletypewriter line bill, he insisted Ted either shut the office down, or find some way to pay for it. Ted Jones paid for it by opening one-broker offices on either side of the teletypewriter line, stretching from St. Louis, Missouri, to Pueblo, Colorado. That is why some of the earliest Edward Jones offices were Dodge City, Hays, Great Bend, Manhattan in Kansas, and Jefferson City in Missouri. Small town branch operations took "Wall Street to Main Street" and created a high volume of sales for the company and its brokers. About 10% of its business in the 1960s was in commodity trading due to many clients being cattle farmers.

Edward Jones Investments had the naming rights for the Edward Jones Dome in Saint Louis, Missouri. After the St. Louis Rams decided to move to Los Angeles, Edward Jones Investments exercised its right to terminate its sponsorship, and the facility is now known as The Dome at America's Center.

On December 22, 2004, the Securities and Exchange Commission, NASD and the New York Stock Exchange settled enforcement proceedings against Edward Jones, related to allegations that Edward Jones failed to adequately disclose revenue sharing payments that it received from a select group of mutual fund families that Edward Jones recommended to its customers. The company paid a $75 million fine and disclosed the revenue sharing payments on its website.

On August 13, 2015, the Securities and Exchange Commission required Edward Jones to pay a $20 million fine for overcharging retail customers.

The Edward Jones PAC made two contributions to Senator Josh Hawley since he was elected in November 2018 – a $2,500 contribution to a luncheon in April 2019 and a $1,000 contribution to a virtual event in 2020. In January 2021 Edward Jones paused all contributions to elected officials and political organizations.

At the end of the first quarter of 2021 the company had 18,967 advisors, a decrease of a bit less than 1% since the same time in 2020 when there were 19,027 advisors. The average growth from year to year is about 6%. The decrease was mainly a consequence of the COVID-19 pandemic which reduced hiring.

Business model

Edward Jones financial advisors offer commission-based and fee-based financial products. Offices are usually staffed by a financial advisor (licensed broker) and one branch office administrator. The branch office administrator acts as an assistant to the financial advisor, filling the roles of a secretary, manager, and co-worker. The one-broker-per-office model allows clients to choose their broker directly, and deal with that person exclusively. As of 2017, Edward Jones had the largest number of brokers, with 16,095, and, branch offices, with 13,499, among brokerage firms in the United States.

Corporate affairs
The company has its corporate headquarters in the City of Des Peres in St. Louis County, Missouri. Adjacent to the company headquarters is the Edward Jones South Campus, located at the intersection of Ballas Road and Manchester Road. The Edward Jones North Campus is located on a zoned plot southeast of the intersection of Interstate 270 and Dorsett Road in the City of Maryland Heights in St. Louis County.

Edward Jones has locations in the United States and Canada. The company had offices in the United Kingdom for 10 years, before selling the division to British brokerage firm Towry Law in 2009.

Awards and rankings
J.D. Power and Associates designated Edward Jones Investments as the firm with the "Highest Investor Satisfaction" nine times between the years 2002 and 2019. The Canadian Arm of J.D. Power also designated the firm with "Highest Investor Satisfaction" for nine years between 2006 and 2019.

In 2020, Fortune magazine ranked Edward Jones Investments at number seven on their Fortune List of the Top 100 Companies to Work For in 2020 based on an employee survey of satisfaction.

J.D. Power's 2021 US Full-Service Investor Satisfaction Study ranked Edward Jones highest in investor satisfaction. In 2021, Fortune named the company one of the "100 Best Companies to Work For" for the 22nd time, ranking it number 20.

References

External links

Official site

Brokerage firms
Companies based in St. Louis County, Missouri
American companies established in 1922
Financial services companies established in 1922
Privately held companies based in Missouri
1922 establishments in Missouri